Flavia Lattanzi (born 4 October 1940) is an Italian lawyer specialized in international law who is ad litem judge at the International Criminal Tribunal for the former Yugoslavia (ICTY) since 2007 and professor at the Roma Tre University. Between 2003 and 2007, she served as ad litem judge at the International Criminal Tribunal for Rwanda.

Early life and education
Flavia Lattanzi was born on 4 October 1940 in Addis Ababa, Italian East Africa. As a newborn, she was sent to the English Concentration Camp in Ethiopia together with her mother, while her father was imprisoned in Uganda. She was the only child under the age of three which had been saved from the camp. She studied law at the Sapienza University of Rome where she also specialized in international law. Lattanzi speaks Italian, Russian and English fluently.

Career
Since 1966, Lattanzi works as rapporteur at international conferences, congresses and seminars on international humanitarian law, human rights and international criminal law. From 1966 until 1985 she worked as Assistant Professor of International Law at the D'Annunzio University of Chieti–Pescara. In the meanwhile, since 1970 until 2003, she worked as coordinator of many research projects on international law and international
humanitarian law, human rights and international criminal law. From 1985 until 1990 she worked as Associate Professor of International Law at the University of Pisa and Libera Università Internazionale degli Studi Sociali Guido Carli. In 1990, Lattanzi becomes Full Professor of International Law at the University of Sassari. From 1995 until 2001, Lattanzi worked as Director of Department of Public Legal Sciences of the University of Teramo, and Scientific Supervisor and Lecturer at the Arusha School of International
Criminal Law and Human Rights (1996–1998) and the Gaborone School on International Criminal Jurisdictions of the University of Botswana (1999).
From 1996 until 2000, she served as director of the board of directors of the European Public Law Center. From 1997 until 2001, Lattanzi worked as Director of School of Specialization in European Law of the University of Teramo. In 1998, she became legal adviser of the Italian delegation to the Diplomatic Conference for the Establishment of an International Criminal Court. From 1998 until 2001, Lattanzi served as legal adviser to the Italian delegation at the International Criminal Court Preparatory Commission, and Director of the International Masters course on cooperation against
International Transnational Crime at the University of Teramo, supported by the Italian Ministry of Education, Universities and Research and in collaboration with the University of Cologne (Germany), University of Barcelona (Spain), University of Seville (Spain), University of Bucharest (Romania), University of Prague (Czech Republic), University of Zagreb (Croatia), and University of Sarajevo (Bosnia and Herzegovina). From 1999 until 2002, she was a member and then President of the commission set up by the Italian Ministry of Justice on the implementation of international rules in the matter of criminal judiciary assistance. From  2003 until 2007, Lattanzi served as ad litem judge at the International Criminal Tribunal for Rwanda. In 2005, she became Professor of International Law at the Roma Tre University, member of the International Fact-Finding Commission created by Protocol I
additional to the Geneva Conventions, member of the International Institute of Humanitarian Law and member of its board of directors, as well as member of the Sociera italiana di diritto internazionale of the Société française de droit international and of the International Legal Association. In 2007, she was appointed ad litem judge of the International Criminal Tribunal for the former Yugoslavia. Her first case was that of Bosnian war criminal Rasim Delić.

Vojislav Šešelj trial
Flavia Lattanzi did not agree with conclusions of the majority of members of the ICTY Trial Chamber that acquitted Serbian nationalist Vojislav Šešelj of war crimes and crimes against humanity for his role in the 1990s Yugoslav Wars. In a lengthy dissenting opinion, judge Lattanzi stated that she considered that Šešelj's guilt was proved in eight out of nine counts. She stated that Šešelj had aided and abetted the crimes as charged because he provided moral and material support to his volunteer force. Furthermore, judge Lattanzi noted that most members of the Trial Chamber did not take into account the climate of intimidation created by Šešelj against witnesses during the trial. Lattanzi was convinced that widespread and systematic attacks had been carried out in Croatia, Bosnia and Herzegovina, and Vojvodina, and that the crimes against humanity have been committed. Lattanzi pointed out that, according to the presented evidence, it was not a reasonable inference that the forcible transfer of non-Serb population from certain villages by buses could be considered as "humanitarian aid", as stated by some other judges. She stated that there was all the necessary evidence in the case file needed for proving a widespread or systematic attack on Croatia and Bosnia and Herzegovina. According to judge Lattanzi, conclusions of judges Jean Claude Antonetti (France) and Niang Mandiaye (Senegal) were not supported by any sufficient explanations whatsoever. Judge Lattanzi noticed that these two judges rarely mentioned any laws to which they referred, and even if they did their analysis was contrary to the provisions of those laws. In addition, judges Antonetti and Mandiaye were adding new legal standards that did not exist in the case law. Judge Lattanzi called on the members of the Council who voted for Šešelj's acquitting of "franchising the rules of international humanitarian law that existed before the creation of ICTY, as well as all the rules of the applicable laws that were formulated during ICTY work". She concluded saying: "While I was reading the verdict of the majority of Council members, I had the impression that I went back many centuries ago, to the ancient times of the history of mankind, when the Romans, in order to justify their bloody conquests and murders of political enemies in civil wars, were saying: Silent enim leges inter arma ("For among [times of] arms, the laws fall mute)." On 11 April 2018, the Appeals Chamber overturned the first instance verdict, proclaimed Šešelj guilty of one of nine counts and sentenced him to 10 years in prison.

Armenian genocide
In 2018, Lattanzi published a lengthy legal opinion following her investigation of the Armenian genocide, concluding that the events of 1915 and 1916 meet the legal definition of genocide in the Genocide Convention.

Scientific works
 1981, Organizzazione dell'Aviazione civile internazionale (The Organization of International Civil Aviation), in Enciclopedia del diritto, XXXI, Milan, p. 228 
 1983 L'émergence de l'homme et des peuples dans le droit international contemporain, in Droits de l'homme et des peuples, San Marino, p. 141 
 1983, Garanzie dei diritti dell'uomo nel diritto internazionale generale (The Human Rights Guarantees in International Law), Giuffrè Editore, Milan
 1987, Autodeterminazione dei popoli (The Principle of Self-determination), in Digesto, IV edizione, UTET, Torino
 1988, Struttura dei rapporti internazionali e limiti dei procedimenti di garanzia istituiti con la Convenzione europea dei diritti dell'uomo (The Structure of International Relations and the Limits of Procedures created by the European Convention on Human Rights), in Le garanzie giurisdizionali dei diritti dell'uomo, a cura di Lorenza Carlassare, Cedam, Padova, p. 57 
 1988, Sanzioni internazionali (The International Sanctions), in Enciclopedia del diritto, vol. XLI, p. 536, Milan
 1989, L'impugnativa per nullità nell'arbitrato commerciale internazionale (The Appeal for Nullity in the International Commercial Arbitration), Giuffré, Milan, 
 1994, Assistenza umanitaria e intervento di umanità (Humanitarian Assistance and Humanitarian Intervention), Ed. Provv., Rome
 1995, Assistenza umanitaria e consenso del sovrano territoriale (Humanitarian Assistance and the Consent of Territorial Sovereign), in Studi in ricordo di Antonio Filippo Panzera, vol. I, Bari, p. 415
 1997, Assistenza umanitaria e intervento di umanità (Humanitarian Assistance and Humanitarian Intervention), Giappichelli, Torino
 1998, Rapporti fra giurisdizioni penali internazionali e giurisdizioni penali interne, in Crimini di guerra e competenza delle giurisdizioni nazionali (The Relationships between International Criminal Jurisdictions and National Criminal Jurisdictions, (a cura di PierLuigi Lamberti Zanardi e Gabriella Venturini), Giuffré, Milan
 1999, Essays on the Rome Statute of the International Criminal Court Volume I
 2000, Consiglio di sicurezza (The Security Council), in Enciclopedia giuridica
 2000, The Rome Statute and Domestic Legal Orders: General Aspects and Constitutional Issues 
 2001, The International Criminal Court and National Jurisdictions, in The Rome Statute of the ICC. A Challenge to Impunity (Ed. by Mauro Politi and Giuseppe Nesi), Ashgate, Aldershot, p. 179 
 2001, The Notion of Crimes against Humanity in the ICTY and ICTR Practice, in International and National Prosecution of Crimes Under International Law: Current Developments (Ed. by Horst Fischer, Claus Kress and Sascha Rolf Lüder), Berlin Verlag Arno Spitz
 2004, Essays on the Rome Statute of the International Criminal Court Volume II 
 2005, The Rome Statute and Domestic Legal Orders: Constitutional Issues, Cooperation and Enforcement

References

1940 births
Living people
International Criminal Tribunal for Rwanda judges
20th-century Italian lawyers
Academic staff of the D'Annunzio University of Chieti–Pescara
Academic staff of Roma Tre University
Academic staff of the University of Teramo
Academic staff of the University of Sassari
Academic staff of the University of Pisa
Academic staff of the Libera Università Internazionale degli Studi Sociali Guido Carli
Academic staff of the University of Botswana
Italian judges of United Nations courts and tribunals
International Criminal Tribunal for the former Yugoslavia judges
Italian expatriates in Ethiopia
21st-century Italian judges